Jouko Lindstedt (born in 1955) is a Finnish linguist and a professor at the University of Helsinki. Lindstedt is a member of the Academy of Esperanto and was nominated as the Esperantist of the Year in 2000 (with Hans Bakker and Mauro La Torre ) by The Wave of Esperanto.

The number of Esperanto speakers 
In 1996 Jouko Lindstedt estimated the number of speakers of Esperanto, saying:
 1 000 have Esperanto as a native language.
 10 000 speak it fluently, as if natively.
 100 000 can use Esperanto for effective communication.
 1 000 000 know the elements of it.
Lindstedt explains that these are very imprecise figures; they mean, for example, that "if it is estimated the number of native Esperanto speakers only in hundreds, it may be too little, but there is not many thousands of them."  According to feedback from Lindstedt, Edmund Grimley Evans has modified the scheme by adding
 10 000 000 have at some time studied Esperanto a little [1].

References

1955 births
Living people
Finnish Esperantists
Linguists from Finland
Academic staff of the University of Helsinki